Errenban Township is a township under the administration of Mishan in Heilongjiang, China. , it has 15 villages under its administration.

References 

Township-level divisions of Heilongjiang
Mishan